The nitrosonium ion is , in which the nitrogen atom is bonded to an oxygen atom with a bond order of 3, and the overall diatomic species bears a positive charge. It can be viewed as nitric oxide with one electron removed. The  and  salts are slightly soluble in acetonitrile .

It arises via protonation of nitrous acid:
HONO + H+  NO+ + H2O

Chemical properties

Hydrolysis
 reacts readily with water to form nitrous acid:

For this reason, nitrosonium compounds must be protected from water or even moist air. With base, the reaction generates nitrite:

As a diazotizing agent
 reacts with aryl amines, to give diazonium salts, . The resulting diazonium group is easily displaced (unlike the amino group) by a variety of nucleophiles.

As an oxidizing agent
 vs. ferrocene/ferrocenium,  in  solution has a redox potential of 1.00 V (or 1.46–1.48 V vs SCE),
 vs. ferrocene/ferrocenium,  in  solution has a redox potential of 0.87 V vs. (or 1.27–1.25 V vs SCE).

Upon contact with air, NO forms , which can cause secondary reactions if it is not removed.  is readily detectable by its characteristic orange color.

Nitrosylation of arenes
Electron-rich arenes are nitrosylated using NOBF4. One example involves anisole:
 CH3OC6H5 + NOBF4 → CH3OC6H4NO + HBF4
Nitrosonium, is sometimes confused with nitronium, NO, the active agent in nitrations. These species are quite different, however. Nitronium is a more potent electrophile than is nitrosonium, as anticipated by the fact that the former is derived from a strong acid (nitric acid) and the latter from a weak acid (nitrous acid).

As a source of nitrosyl complexes

NOBF4 reacts with some metal carbonyl complexes to yield related metal nitrosyl complexes. One must be careful that [NO]+ is transferred vs. electron transfer (see above).
 (C6Et6)Cr(CO)3 + NOBF4 → [(C6Et6)Cr(CO)2(NO)]BF4 + CO

See also
Nitronium
Nitric oxide

References

Oxycations
Nitrogen(III) compounds